The benta is a large one-string bamboo zither native to Jamaica. The instrument is an idiochord, in that the string of the instrument is made from the same piece of bamboo as composes the body. The instrument is played by two men sitting astride it at either end, one striking the string and the other changing the pitch of the string by using a gourd like a guitar slide.

The instrument is primarily used to accompany Dinki Mini mourning ceremonies in Saint Mary Parish and Portland Parish.

See also
Diddley bow, a similar slide-monochord in the United States

References

External links
"Celebration Of Jamaica's Heritage", The Gleaner, 8 February 2018. Newspaper article about benta]

Jamaican musical instruments
Bamboo musical instruments
Monochords
Idiochords